Cucciago railway station is a railway station in Italy. Located on the Milan–Chiasso railway, it serves the town of Cucciago.

Services
Cucciago is served by the line S11 of Milan suburban railway service, operated by the lombard railway company Trenord.

References

See also
Milan suburban railway service

Railway stations in Lombardy
Railway stations opened in 1849
Milan S Lines stations
1849 establishments in the Austrian Empire
Railway stations in Italy opened in 1849